"Party on Fifth Ave." is a song by American hip hop artist Mac Miller, and the second single from his debut album Blue Slide Park. The I.D. Labs-produced track was released digitally on October 28, 2011 along with an accompanying music video.

Background
"Party on Fifth Ave." is a hip hop song. It features a sample of the main loop from DJ Mark the 45 King's 1987 song "The 900 Number". The same loop was used by DJ Kool for his single "Let Me Clear My Throat" in 1996.  The original source of the loop is Marva Whitney's 1967 funky soul track "Unwind Yourself."

The song's music video features Mac Miller and his crew dressed as elderly men, complete with mobility scooters and canes.  The video was directed by Ian Wolfson.

Track listing

Chart performance
The song entered the Billboard Hot 100 chart at #64 on November 10, as well as reaching #4 on the Top Heatseekers charts respectively.

Charts

Weekly charts

Certifications

References

2011 singles
2011 songs
Mac Miller songs
Rostrum Records singles
Songs written by Hank Ballard
Songs written by Mac Miller